Warmandi is the district capital of Abun in Tambrauw Regency in the Indonesian province of Southwest Papua. The village is located on the northern coast of the Bird's Head Peninsula.

References

Populated places in Southwest Papua
Populated places in Tambrauw

Southwest Papua